KXXY-FM (96.1 MHz, "96.1 KXY") is a commercial radio station in Oklahoma City, Oklahoma and is owned by iHeartMedia, Inc.  It airs a classic country radio format.  In its logo, the station omits one of the two Xs in its call sign, calling itself "KXY".

KXXY-FM's studios and offices are located at the 50 Penn Place Building on the northwest side of Oklahoma City.  The transmitter is off NE 122nd Street in Oklahoma City, near the John Kilpatrick Turnpike.

History
The station signed on in October 1964 as the second KOCY-FM in Oklahoma City. For its first five years, it simulcast the middle of the road music programming of co-owned KOCY (1340 AM).

In the late 1960s, the Federal Communications Commission began encouraging AM-FM combos to offer separate programming.  In 1969, KOCY-FM switched to progressive rock, styled after stations such as KMPX in San Francisco and WNEW-FM in New York City.

On October 24, 1972, the station changed its call sign to KXXY-FM to give it a separate identity from its AM sister station.  Over time, it moved from free form progressive rock to a more tightly-formatted album-oriented rock format. After 13 years of rock music, management decided to make a change.

On May 27, 1982, KXXY-FM flipped to country music, stunting by playing the song "You're the Reason God Made Oklahoma" for 24 hours.  KXXY-FM became an aggressive country competitor to KEBC, which had been the leading FM country outlet since signing on in 1967.  KXXY-FM edged ahead of KEBC in 1983 and would widen its lead to eight share points by the end of the decade.  In 1992, it peaked at an 18.4 share, and it was the top-billing station in Oklahoma City every year from 1985 to 1998. However, the station slumped in the late 1990s and 2000s.

In 1996, KXXY-FM was acquired by San Antonio-based Clear Channel Communications.  Clear Channel later changed its name to the current iHeartMedia, Inc. in September 2014.

KXXY, along with the other iHeart stations in Oklahoma City, simulcasts audio of KFOR-TV if a tornado warning is issued within the Oklahoma City metro area.

References

External links
KXXY official website

XXY-FM
Classic country radio stations in the United States
1964 establishments in Oklahoma
Radio stations established in 1964
IHeartMedia radio stations